Jovan Marinković  (born 12 September 1996) is a Serbian football centre back, playing for Napredak Kruševac .

Club career
Born in Niš, Marinković came throw the Radnički Niš youth academy. After he completed his categories and overgrown youth level, he moved to the local club Sinđelić. Shortly after signing with club, Marinković was elected for the team captain during the 2015–16 season. Playing with Sinđelić, Marinković collected 39 caps and scored 2 goals in the Serbian League East until the end of 2016. At the beginning of February 2017, Marinković moved to the Serbian First League side BSK Borča, where he made his debut in 18 fixture match of the 2016–17 season, against Budućnost Dobanovci.

Career statistics

Club

References

1996 births
Living people
Sportspeople from Niš
Serbian footballers
Association football defenders
FK Sinđelić Niš players
FK BSK Borča players
FK Javor Ivanjica players
OFK Bačka players
FK Napredak Kruševac players
Serbian First League players
Serbian SuperLiga players